Margit Meissner née Müller (born 31 October 1952) is a retired German field hockey player.

Müller played for VfL Wolfsburg and Eintracht Braunschweig. With Braunschweig, she won eight German championship titles. She also played 100 games in total for the German national team.

With West Germany, Müller won the 1976 Women's Hockey World Cup. She was also called up to the West German squad for the 1980 Summer Olympics. However, due to the 1980 Summer Olympics boycott, the West German team ultimately didn't enter the tournament.

In 1974, Müller was awarded the Silbernes Lorbeerblatt. In 1988, she was inducted into the hall of fame of the Lower Saxon Institute of Sports History.

References

External links 
 

1952 births
Living people
German female field hockey players
People from Oebisfelde-Weferlingen
Sportspeople from Saxony-Anhalt
Recipients of the Silver Laurel Leaf